Julius Kahn may refer to:

Julius Kahn (inventor) (1874–1942), engineer of reinforced concrete
Julius Kahn (congressman) (1861–1924), United States congressman